The Al-Sarafiya Bridge crosses the River Tigris in Baghdad, Iraq. It was built in the 1940s or 1950s and connected the two northern Baghdad neighborhoods of Waziriyah and Utafiyah.

Having been previously damaged by American bombing in 1991, the bridge partially collapsed when an abandoned truck bomb exploded on April 12, 2007 at 0700 local time, UTC+3. At least 10 people were killed and 26 injured, though there were reports of 20 more trapped in cars that had gone off the bridge.

The bridge was reconstructed in a year and two months and reopened on May 27, 2008, when former Prime Minister Nouri al-Maliki inaugurated it.

Gallery

References

 

Bridges in Iraq
Buildings and structures in Baghdad
Bridge disasters in Iraq
Bridge disasters caused by warfare
Bridge disasters caused by terrorism
Bridges over the Tigris River
Bridges completed in 2008
2007 disasters in Iraq